Sean Doyle is an Australian professional rugby union player whose favoured position is flanker.

Career

Doyle started his career playing for Sydney-based Shute Shield side Southern Districts.

In 2012, he moved to Belfast, where he spent two seasons at Pro12 side Ulster Rugby. Despite breaking his leg shortly after his arrival, causing him to miss most of the 2012–13 season, he became an important players for them during the 2013–14 season.

In October 2015, it was announced that Doyle has joined Irish Pro12 side Munster on a three-month contract, his second stint in Ireland after making 24 appearances for Ulster between 2012–14.

References

Living people
Australian rugby union players
Ulster Rugby players
Munster Rugby players
Canberra Vikings players
ACT Brumbies players
Australian expatriate rugby union players
Expatriate rugby union players in Northern Ireland
Australian expatriate sportspeople in Northern Ireland
Australian people of Irish descent
Rugby union players from Sydney
1989 births
Australian expatriate sportspeople in Ireland
Rugby union flankers
Expatriate rugby union players in Ireland